The following lists events that happened during 2002 in the Grand Duchy of Luxembourg.

Incumbents

Events

January – March
 1 January – New Euro banknotes and coins are introduced to replace those of the Luxembourgian franc.
 28 January – The government signs a treaty with France, at Rémilly, agreeing to extend the TGV Est to Luxembourg City.
 18 February – Arcelor is launched as an operating concern.
 28 February – Luxembourgian franc banknotes and coins cease to be legal tender.
 29 March – SES launches its 3A satellite.

April – June
 7 May – Jean-Claude Juncker delivers his eighth State of the Nation address.
 24 May – FC Avenir Beggen win the Luxembourg Cup, beating F91 Dudelange 1–0 in the final.
 2 June – Marcus Ljungqvist wins the 2002 Tour de Luxembourg, with Team Fakta picking up the team title.

July – September
 7 July – Luxembourg City plays host to the grand départ of the 2002 Tour de France.
 6 September – Utopia Group SA formed from the merger of Utopia SA and Dutch company Polyfilm BV.
 13 September – The most southern section of the A7 motorway, between the Grünewald and Waldhof, opens.

October – December
 6 November – Luxair Flight 9642 crashes near Niederanven, on the approach to Luxembourg-Findel.  20 of the 22 passengers and crew members die.
 26 November – SES' 1K satellite fails to deploy properly after launch, requiring it to be deorbited.  This is SES's first unintended loss.

Deaths
 4 February – Prince Sigvard, Duke of Uppland
 24 April – Lucien Wercollier, sculptor
 24 June – Pierre Werner, politician
 6 November – Michel Majerus, artist

References

 
Years of the 21st century in Luxembourg
Luxembourg
2000s in Luxembourg
Luxembourg